is a sub-kilometer sized asteroid, classified as near-Earth object and potentially hazardous asteroid of the Apollo group. It was discovered on 4 December 1997, by the Lincoln Near-Earth Asteroid Research (LINEAR) program at Lincoln Laboratory's Experimental Test Site near Socorro, New Mexico, in the United States.

Orbit and classification 

The asteroid orbits the Sun at a distance of 0.9–1.3 AU once every 13 months (408 days). Its orbit has an eccentricity of 0.20 and an inclination of 7° with respect to the ecliptic.

It has an Earth minimum orbital intersection distance of 0.000135 AU, which corresponds to 0.05 lunar distances. The body's observation arc begins with its official discovery observation, as no precoveries were taken, and no prior identifications were made.

Impact risk 

Between 2002 and 2006,  was considered to have about a 1 in 10,000 chance of colliding with Earth on 1 June 2101, based on a 27-day observation arc following its discovery. Both  and 99942 Apophis are now rated at level zero.

Recovery 

On 24 February 2006,  was observed by the Mount Lemmon Survey after being lost for more than 8 years. The refinement of its orbit eliminated the possibility of impact in 2101. It is now known that on 20 November 2101, the asteroid will be  from Earth.

Physical characteristics 

According to a generic conversion of absolute magnitude to diameter,  measures 200 to 230 meters.

Naming 

As of 2017, this minor planet remains unnamed.

References

External links 
 Earth Impact Risk Ratings Posted in the Last 31 Days , A/CC's Consolidated Risk Tables
 Asteroid Lightcurve Database (LCDB), query form (info )
 Asteroids and comets rotation curves, CdR – Observatoire de Genève, Raoul Behrend
 
 
 

433953
433953
433953
433953
19971204